is a liqueur from the distillation of the flowers of the mammee apple with spirits of wine.

Liqueurs
French liqueurs
Alcoholic drinks